Dean Brosnan (born 24 June 1991) is an Irish hurler who plays for Cork Senior Championship club Glen Rovers. He was a member of the Cork senior hurling team for three seasons, during which time he usually lined as a forward, either in the half-forward or full-forward line.

Playing career

University College Cork

During his studies at University College Cork, Brosnan was selected for the college's senior hurling team on a number of occasions. On 3 March 2012, he won a Fitzgibbon Cup medal after coming on as a 55th-minute substitute for Dan McCormack when the university defeated the Cork Institute of Technology by 2-15 to 2-14 in the final.

Glen Rovers

Brosnan joined the Glen Rovers club at a young age and played in all grades at juvenile and underage levels, winning a Cork Under-21 Championship medal as a 17-year-old in 2008. He made his first appearance for the club's senior team on 8 August 2009 in a 1-21 to 0-13 Cork Senior Championship quarter-final defeat by Newtownshandrum.

On 11 October 2015, Brosnan won his first Cork Senior Championship medal after scoring three points from play when Glen Rovers defeated Sarsfields by 2-17 to 1-13 in the final.

Brosnan won his second Cork Senior Championship medal on 9 October 2016 when he scored four points in a 0-19 to 2-11 defeat of Erin's Own in the final.

On 20 October 2019, Brosnan played in his fifth final when Glen Rovers faced Imokilly. Lining out at right wing-forward, he scored two points from play but ended the game on the losing side following a 2-17 to 1-16 defeat.

Cork

Minor and under-21

Brosnan first played for Cork at minor level on 24 June 2009 and scored 1-01 in a 5-17 apiece draw with Tipperary in the Munster Championship. His one season in this grade ended without silverware.

Brosnan was subsequently selected for the Cork under-21 team and made his first appearance on 3 August 2011 as a substitute in a 4-20 to 1-27 Munster Championship defeat by Limerick. He was also included on the Cork under-21 team the following year, however, his tenure in the grade ended without success.

Senior

Brosnan was added to the Cork senior hurling panel in late 2015 and made his first appearances during the pre-season 2016 Munster League. He was an unused substitute for Cork's subsequent National Hurling League and All-Ireland Championship matches.

Brosnan made his first National League appearance 11 February 2017, replacing Shane Kingston in a 0-21 to 1-11 defeat of Clare. He later made his first Munster Championship appearance on 18 June, coming on as a substitute for Alan Cadogan in a 0-21 to 1-15 defeat of Waterford at the semi-final stage. On 9 July, he won his first Munster Championship medal as a non-playing substitute following a 1-25 to 1-20 defeat of Clare in the final.

On 1 July 2018, Brosnan won a second successive Munster Championship medal after being introduced as a 73rd-minute for Lorcán McLoughlin in Cork's 2-24 to 3-19 defeat of Clare in the final.

Career statistics

Club

Inter-county

Honours

University College Cork
 Fitzgibbon Cup (1): 2012

Glen Rovers
 Cork Senior Hurling Championship (2): 2015, 2016
 Cork Under-21 Hurling Championship (1): 2008

Cork
Munster Senior Hurling Championship (2): 2017, 2018
Munster Senior Hurling League (1): 2017

References

External links
Dean Brosnan profile at the Cork GAA website

1991 births
Living people
Cork inter-county hurlers
Glen Rovers hurlers
St Nicholas' Gaelic footballers
UCC hurlers